The Seafarer Bahama 35 MS is a Dutch sailboat that was designed by American naval architect Philip Rhodes as a cruiser and first built in 1960. It was Rhodes' design #702.

The design was developed by Seafarer Yachts into the Seafarer 38C in 1972.

Production
The design was built by de Vries Lentsch in the Netherlands starting in 1960 and Seafarer Yachts imported it in the United States. It is now out of production.

Design
The Seafarer Bahama 35 MS is a recreational keelboat, built predominantly of fiberglass, with wood trim. It has a masthead sloop rig, an angled transom, a rudder controlled by a wheel and a fixed long keel. It displaces  and carries  of lead ballast.

The boat is fitted with a Universal  inboard engine for docking and maneuvering.

See also
List of sailing boat types

References

External links
Photo of a Seafarer Bahama 35 MS

Keelboats
1960s sailboat type designs
Sailing yachts
Sailboat type designs by Philip Rhodes
Sailboat types built by De Vries Lentsch